Please is the debut album by Matt Nathanson, released in July 1993 on Acrobat Records.

Track listing
"Solace and Pain" – 3:03
"Continue Dreaming" – 3:06
"King of the Mountain" – 3:32
"Broken" – 2:33
"Illusions" – 2:50
"Hold Me" – 2:56
"Never forget my Memories" – 2:55
"Lost Myself in Search of You" – 2:44
"Pity" – 3:36
"Lie" – 4:15
"Naked" – 3:33
"Don't Worship Me" – 2:25
"Harbor" – 4:34

References
Official Site 

1993 debut albums
Matt Nathanson albums